Pai syndrome, also known as Median cleft of the upper lip-corpus callosum lipoma-midline facial cutaneous polyps syndrome, is a very rare genetic disorder which is characterized by nervous system, cutaneous, ocular, nasal and bucal anomalies with facial dysmorphisms.

Signs and symptoms 

List of common symptoms:

 Depressed nasal bridge
 Median cleft lip
 Central nervous system lipomas.
 Nasal polyposis
 Presence of skin tags
 Subcutaneous nodule

List of not-so-common symptoms:[2]

 Oral frenulum abnormalities
 Bifid uvula
 Hypertelorism
 Telecanthus

List of uncommon symptoms:[2]

 Missing/underdeveloped corpus callosum
 Down-slanting palpebral fissures
 Encephalocele
 Coloboma
 Nose defects
 Frontal bossing
 High palate

Causes 

A specific, shared genetic cause hasn't been found. The closest thing to it was a case reported by Masuno et al. of a Japanese girl with symptoms of the disorder plus short stature and intellectual disabilities with a spontaneous reciprocal translocation. This translocation involved chromosome Xq28 and chromosome 16q11.2 (more specifically, 46,X,t(X;16)(q28;q11.2).

Epidemiology 

According to OMIM, 18 cases have been described in medical literature, but according to ORPHAnet, 67 cases have been described.

References 

Genetic diseases and disorders